South Brookfield  is a community in the Canadian province of Nova Scotia, located in the Region of Queens Municipality.

Parks
Cameron's Brook Provincial Park

References
South Brookfield on Destination Nova Scotia

Communities in the Region of Queens Municipality
General Service Areas in Nova Scotia